Johnny Cash and His Woman is an album by American country singer Johnny Cash and features his wife, June Carter Cash. It was released on Columbia Records in 1973. It is Johnny Cash's 46th album and it peaked at No. 32 on the country album charts.

Track listing

Personnel 
Johnny Cash - vocals, guitar
June Carter Cash - vocals
Bob Wootton, Carl Perkins, David Jones - guitar
Marshall Grant - bass
WS Holland - drums
Bill Walker, Jerry Whitehurst - piano, keyboards

Additional personnel 
Produced by Don Law Productions
Arranged and conducted by Bill Walker
Engineering: Charlie Bragg, Roger Tucker, Joey Watson,

Charts

Album - Billboard (United States)

Singles - Billboard (United States)

References

Johnny Cash albums
June Carter Cash albums
1973 albums
Columbia Records albums
Vocal duet albums